Bruce Mandeville (born 3 May 1960) is a Canadian equestrian. He competed at the 2000 Summer Olympics and the 2004 Summer Olympics.

References

External links
 

1960 births
Living people
Canadian male equestrians
Olympic equestrians of Canada
Equestrians at the 2000 Summer Olympics
Equestrians at the 2004 Summer Olympics
Pan American Games medalists in equestrian
Pan American Games silver medalists for Canada
Equestrians at the 2003 Pan American Games
Sportspeople from New Westminster
Medalists at the 2003 Pan American Games
20th-century Canadian people
21st-century Canadian people